Lozzo di Cadore is a comune (municipality) in the Province of Belluno in the Italian region of Veneto, located about  north of Venice and about  northeast of Belluno in the Cadore.

References

External links
 Official website

Cities and towns in Veneto